Edward Harvey-Johnston (16 September 1912 – 1971) was an English cricketer. He played four first-class matches for Bengal between 1942 and 1944.

See also
 List of Bengal cricketers

References

External links
 

1912 births
1971 deaths
English cricketers
Bengal cricketers
Cricketers from Peshawar